In chemistry, azeotropic distillation is any of a range of techniques used to break an azeotrope in distillation.  In chemical engineering, azeotropic distillation usually refers to the specific technique of adding another component to generate a new, lower-boiling azeotrope that is heterogeneous (e.g. producing two, immiscible liquid phases), such as the example below with the addition of benzene to water and ethanol. 

This practice of adding an entrainer which forms a separate phase is a specific sub-set of (industrial) azeotropic distillation methods, or combination thereof.  In some senses, adding an entrainer is similar to extractive distillation.

Material separation agent 
The addition of a material separation agent, such as benzene to an ethanol/water mixture, changes the molecular interactions and eliminates the azeotrope. Added in the liquid phase, the new component can alter the activity coefficient of various compounds in different ways thus altering a mixture's relative volatility. Greater deviations from Raoult's law make it easier to achieve significant changes in relative volatility with the addition of another component. In azeotropic distillation the volatility of the added component is the same as the mixture, and a new azeotrope is formed with one or more of the components based on differences in polarity. If the material separation agent is selected to form azeotropes with more than one component in the feed then it is referred to as an entrainer. The added entrainer should be recovered by distillation, decantation, or another separation method and returned near the top of the original column.

Distillation of ethanol/water 
A common historical example of azeotropic distillation is its use in dehydrating ethanol and water mixtures. For this, a near azeotropic mixture is sent to the final column where azeotropic distillation takes place. Several entrainers can be used for this specific process: benzene, pentane, cyclohexane, hexane, heptane, isooctane, acetone, and diethyl ether are all options as the mixture. Of these benzene and cyclohexane have been used the most extensively. However, because benzene has been discovered to be a carcinogenic compound, its use has declined. While this method was the standard for dehydrating ethanol in the past, it has lost favor due to the high capital and energy costs associated with it.
Another favorable method and less toxic than using benzene to break the azeotrope of the ethanol-water system is to use toluene instead.

Pressure-swing distillation 
Another method, pressure-swing distillation, relies on the fact that an azeotrope is pressure dependent. An azeotrope is not a range of concentrations that cannot be distilled, but the point at which the activity coefficients of the distillates are crossing one another.  If the azeotrope can be "jumped over", distillation can continue, although because the activity coefficients have crossed, the water will boil out of the remaining ethanol, rather than the ethanol out of the water as at lower concentrations.

To "jump" the azeotrope, the azeotrope can be moved by altering the pressure.  Typically, pressure will be set such that the azeotrope will differ from the azeotrope at ambient pressure by some percent in either direction.  For an ethanol-water mixture, that may be at 93.9% for 20bar overpressure, instead of 95.3% at ambient pressure. The distillation then works in the opposite direction, with the ethanol emerging in the bottoms and the water in the distillate. While in the low pressure column, ethanol is enriched on the way to the top end of the column, the high pressure column enriches ethanol on the bottom end, as ethanol is now the highboiler. The top product (water as distillate) is then again fed to the low pressure column, where the normal distillation is done. The bottom product of the low pressure column primarily consists of water, while the bottom stream of the high pressure column is nearly pure ethanol at concentrations of 99% or higher.  Pressure swing distillation essentially inverts the K-values and subsequently inverts which end of the column each component comes out when compared to standard low pressure distillation.   

Overall the pressure-swing distillation is a very robust and not so highly sophisticated method compared to multi component distillation or membrane processes, but the energy demand is in general higher. Also the investment cost of the distillation columns is higher, due to the pressure inside the vessels.

Molecular Sieves 

For low boiling azeotropes distillation may not allow the components to be fully separated, and must make use of separation methods that does not rely on distillation. A common approach involves the use of molecular sieves. Treatment of 96% ethanol with molecular sieves gives anhydrous alcohol, the sieves having adsorbed water from the mixture. The sieves can be subsequently regenerated by dehydration using a vacuum oven.

Dehydration reactions
In organic chemistry, some dehydration reactions are subject to unfavorable but fast equilibria. One example is the formation of dioxolanes from aldehydes:
RCHO + (CH2OH)2  RCH(OCH2)2 + H2O
Such unfavorable reactions proceed when water is removed by azeotropic distillation.

See also 
Azeotrope tables
Residue curve
Theoretical plate
Vacuum distillation

References

Distillation